Baraikhali Union is a union parishad under Morrelganj Upazila of Bagerhat District in the division of Khulna, Bangladesh. It has an area of 72.80 km2 (28.11 sq mi) and a population of 2,869.

References

Khulna Division
Bagerhat District